Six ships of the Royal Navy and one naval base have borne the name HMS Stag:

  was a 32-gun  launched on 4 September 1758.  She was reduced to a 28-gun sixth rate in 1777, but restored as a 32-gun fifth rate in 1779. She was broken up in July 1783 at Deptford.
  was a 32-gun fifth rate launched in 1794 and wrecked in 1800 at Vigo Bay.
  was a 36-gun fifth rate launched in 1812 and broken up in 1821.
  was a 46-gun fifth rate launched in 1830, breaking up completed in 1866.
  was a coastguard yawl launched in 1861 and sold in 1891.
She survived World War I to be sold in 1921.
  was the name used for the base for British naval personnel in Egypt. First established at Port Said, it commissioned 8 January 1940. There were outposts at Adabya, Kabrit, Ismailia, Generiffa, Port Tewfik and Haifa in Palestine.  It was paid off in May 1949.

Hired armed cutter
 HM Hired armed cutter Stag, of 133 tons (bm) and fourteen 4-pounder guns, served under contract from 31 August 1795 to 22 October 1801.
 HM hired armed cutter Stag, of 57 tons (bm) and six 3-pounder guns, served under contract between 26 March 1804 and 24 December 1804.

Citations

References
 
  

Royal Navy ship names